The Mananciais do Rio Paraíba do Sul Environmental Protection Area is an environmental protection area in the state of São Paulo, Brazil.

Location

In São Paulo it covers parts of the municipalities of Areias, Arujá, Bananal, Cachoeira Paulista, Cruzeiro, Guaratinguetá, Guarulhos, Igaratá, Jacareí, Jambeiro, Lavrinhas, Monteiro Lobato, Natividade da Serra, Paraibuna, Piquete, Queluz, Redenção da Serra, Santa Branca, Santa Isabel, Silveiras, São José do Barreiro, São José dos Campos and Taubaté.

The APA contains the Paraibuna, Santa Branca and Rio Jaguari reservoirs.
It covers parts of the basins of the Paraitinga and Paraibuna rivers, tributaries of the Paraíba do Sul, as well as the basins of the Jaguari, Buquira, Una, Bocaina and Bananal rivers.

Environment

The vegetation is in the Atlantic Forest biome, with dense high montane, montane and low montane rainforest.
In the lower, warmer slopes of the Paraíba Valley there is semi-deciduous forest with cerrado enclaves.
Cerrado species include Alibertia elliptica, Cupania oblongifolia and Miconia ferruginata.
Endemic species of fauna include buffy-tufted marmoset (Callithrix aurita), white-bearded antshrike (Biatas nigropectus), brown-backed parrotlet (Touit melanonotus) and vinaceous-breasted amazon (Amazona vinacea).

History

Mananciais do Rio Paraíba do Sul Environmental Protection Area was created by federal decree 87.561 on 13 September 1982 to restore and protect the hydrographic basin of the Paraíba do Sul.
It is administered by the Chico Mendes Institute for Biodiversity Conservation (ICMBio).
It is classed as IUCN protected area category V (protected landscape/seascape). The purpose is to protect the sources of the Paraiba do Sul, to protect biological diversity, to control settlement and to ensure sustainable use of natural resources.

On 9 April 2012 a working group was established to coordinate environmental assessment of forest fragments in the APA.
The municipality of São José dos Campos gave ICMBio the right to use an old weaving mill in the Burle Marx City Park, which was being prepared in 2013. The building would be used by municipal, state and federal environmental agencies and environmental police.
The APA is part of the Mantiqueira Mosaic of conservation units, established in 2006.

Notes

Sources

Environmental protection areas of Brazil
Protected areas of São Paulo (state)
1982 establishments in Brazil